Slovakia competed at the 2020 Summer Paralympics in Tokyo, Japan, from 24 August to 5 September 2021.

Medalists

Competitors
The following is the list of number of competitors in the Games.

Archery 

Slovakia has entered two archer at Men's Individual Compound Open, and one archer in Men's Individual recurve.

Men 

|-
|align=left|Dávid Ivan
|Men's individual recurve 
|609
|14
| W 6-2
| L 0-4
|colspan=4|did not advance
|-align=center
|-
|align=left|Marián Marečák
|Men's individual compound 
|686
|14
| W 138-138
| L 137-140
|colspan=5 |did not advance
|-
|align=left|Marcel Pavlík
|Men's individual compound 
|696
|5
| W 142-139
| W 143-137
| W 144-141
| L 146-148
| L 142-144
|4
|}

Athletics 

Two Slovakian athletes (Marián Kuřeja & Adrián Matušík) successfully to break through the qualifications for the 2020 Paralympics after breaking the qualification limit.

Men's field

Boccia 

Four athletes get a ticket for Slovakia in BC1/BC2 & BC4 events. The team is composed of Samuel Andrejčík, Michaela Balcová, Tomáš Kráľ, Kristína Kudláčová, Rastislav Kurilák, Róbert Mezík and Martin Strehársky.

Individual

Pairs and teams

Cycling 

Slovakia sent one male and one female cyclist after successfully getting a slot in the 2018 UCI Nations Ranking Allocation quota for the European.

Road

Track

Shooting 

Three Slovakian shooters will compete after qualified in Men's 10m Air Rifle Standing SH1, Women's 10m Air Rifle Standing SH2 & Mixed 50m Rifle Prone SH2 events. The shooters names are Radoslav Malenovský, Veronika Vadovičová and Kristína Funková.

Swimming 

One Slovakian swimmer has successfully entered the paralympic slot after breaking the MQS.

Women

Table tennis

Slovakia entered five athletes into the table tennis competition at the games. All of them qualified via World Ranking allocation.

Men

Women

Wheelchair tennis

Slovakia qualified one player entry for wheelchair tennis. Marek Gergely qualified under the bipartite commission invitation allocation quota.

See also 
Slovakia at the Paralympics
Slovakia at the 2020 Summer Olympics

References 

Nations at the 2020 Summer Paralympics
2020
2021 in Slovak sport